The Central Area, also called the City Area, and informally The City, is the main commercial city centre of Singapore. Located in the south-eastern part of the Central Region, the Central Area consists of eleven constituent planning areas: the Downtown Core, Marina East, Marina South, the Museum Planning Area, Newton, Orchard, Outram, River Valley, Rochor, the Singapore River and Straits View, as defined by the Urban Redevelopment Authority. The term Central Business District (CBD) has also been used to describe most of the Central Area as well, although its boundaries lie within the Downtown Core.

Singapore's modern history began in this area, when Stamford Raffles and representatives of the British East India Company landed along the banks of the Singapore River to set up a free port in Southeast Asia. As the old harbour grew along the mouth of the river bank, the city naturally expanded around it, creating what is now the Central Area. As the financial heart of Singapore, the Downtown Core also houses the headquarters and offices of numerous major corporations, both local and international, as well as the Singapore Exchange (SGX). The area is also home to many governmental institutions, notably the seat of Parliament and the Supreme Court of Singapore.

The Central Area surrounds the banks of the Singapore River and Marina Bay where the first settlements on the island were established shortly after the arrival of Raffles in 1819. Surrounding the Central Area is the rest of the Central Region. The Central Area shares boundaries with the planning areas of Novena to the north, Kallang to the north and north-east, Tanglin to the north-west and west, Bukit Merah to the south-west and Marine Parade to the east. The south-easternmost limits of the city is enclosed by Marina Barrage, where the mouth of Marina Bay meets the Singapore Strait.

History

Much of the central area bounded by Telok Ayer Road, which has a high concentration of skyscrapers, is actually built on reclaimed land. Therefore, when Thian Hock Keng Temple was built in 1839 along Telok Ayer Road, the temple used to face the sea and would be the first place visited by newly arrived Chinese immigrants to worship and give thanks to Ma Zu (Goddess of the Sea) for her blessings of their safe voyage. Prior to 1839, the temple served as a joss-house for the Hokkien immigrants. This temple, which is also one of the first Hokkien temple to be built by the Hoklo under the leadership of Tan Tock Seng and Si Hoo Keh, is in the architectural style of southern China, using only materials imported from China and supported with no nails. The clan's office was housed there and this temple was also used as a meeting venue. The construction of the temple was completed in 1842 and details of this temple's history are recorded in granite tablets found on the wall inside the Entrance Hall. A plaque inscribed with the words Bo Jing Nan Ming (Gentle Waves over the South Seas) which was bestowed by the Guangxu Emperor of Qing dynasty in 1907, is found in the temple that indicate evidence of the temple's stature. The temple comprises an architectural works of stone, tiles and wood, dragons and phoenixes, as well as carvings, sculptures and columns.
 The Thian Hock Keng temple has been gazetted as a national monument in 1973. The temple is currently managed by the Hokkien Huay Kuan.

At Church Street is the Yueh Hai Ching Temple, one of the oldest Taoist temples, having been built in 1852 (however, an older wood-and-attap shrine was built on Philip Street 1826). This temple was established by a group of Teochew settlers from Guangzhou in China when they dedicated a shrine to Tian Hou Sheng Mu. This temple faced the sea and was therefore a place where newly arrived Chinese immigrants (sailors and travellers) came to offer their respect to the Goddess for their safe voyage across the seas. The renovation to the temple was undertaken by the Ngee Ann Kongsi, which was formed by a group of immigrants from the Teochew community. This temple served as a meeting place for the people of the Teochew community in the late 19th century when the Teochews became the second largest Chinese Dialect group in Singapore. The temple was honoured with a bian e, an imperial plaque from Emperor Guangxu of the Qing Dynasty in 1907. In 1996 it was gazetted as a national monument and it underwent repairs and restoration works. The background contrast between the old temples and the new modern buildings indicate the juxtaposition and coexistence of new and old. The temple has a cover structure composed of models depicting the lives of Chinese villagers. Guangxu also presented the temple with a signboard that is still displayed in the temple today.

The Armenian Church, located at Hill Street, is the oldest church in Singapore. The funding for the building of the church came from contributions of the Armenian community. It was built in the 1830s by George Coleman, the architect of many buildings in Singapore, for a small Armenian community that once resided in Singapore. The Church was credited as a national monument.

CHIJMES, located at Victoria Street, was originally a Catholic convent which is currently converted into a modern dining area with restaurants. The original structure was well preserved and the chapel is still present. The restaurants reside in the old structures of the convent.

During the Konfrontasi, a group of Indonesian saboteurs bombed the MacDonald House building at Orchard Road. The explosion killed three people and injured at least 33 others.

Land use
The Central Area is one of the most densely developed places in Singapore, with a large mix of commercial and residential developments packed into a space of only 1784 hectares. A great number of Mass Rapid Transit stations are concentrated in this area as well, especially interchange stations and stations along the Circle MRT line. Each of the districts within the Central Area has a heavy and dense commercial presence, especially in the Downtown Core, Orchard and Singapore River districts. Rochor, Newton, River Valley and Outram are commercially thriving, but have fewer skyscrapers and generally include a greater residential presence. Schools, condominiums and Housing Development Board apartments are located in these areas, albeit at higher prices.

Since the 1970s, the Singapore government and the Urban Redevelopment Authority have reclaimed land portions from Marina Bay in an attempt to expand the Central Area. Newly created portions of land surrounding Marina Bay have been organised and labelled into Marina East, Marina South and Straits View. Many construction projects have been completed in these districts since their creation, but most of them are still under consolidation or development. It also houses the headquarters of many Multinational Companies and the Singapore Exchange. The tallest skyscrapers in Singapore are located at the Central Area, mainly the Raffles Place area. They adhere to a height restriction of 280m, except the Tanjong Pagar Centre, which is exempted from the height restriction and is allowed to be built up to 290m.

Shophouses on Ann Siang Hill have changed purposes over the years. In the past, these shophouses were used as clan houses for the various clans that existed in the Chinatown region. Due to a housing shortage exacerbated by World War II, HDB began development of the blocks after the war.

See also
Architecture of Singapore
Tourism in Singapore
City of Singapore (historical entity)
Central Singapore District

References

Further reading
Planning Areas Boundaries Map A, showing extent of the Central Area

 
Places in Singapore